Rosenbergia megalocephala is a species of beetle in the family Cerambycidae. It was described by van der Poll in 1886. It is known from Australia.

References

Batocerini
Beetles described in 1886